bridgeOS is a mobile operating system created and developed by Apple Inc. for use exclusively with its hardware. bridgeOS runs on the T series Apple silicon processors and operates the OLED touchscreen strip called the "Touch Bar" as well as multiple other functions, including managing the encrypted data in their Secure Enclave and acting as a gatekeeper and video codec to the device's cameras. bridgeOS is a heavily modified version of Apple's watchOS.

References

Apple Inc. operating systems
2016 software